
Year 613 (DCXIII) was a common year starting on Monday (link will display the full calendar) of the Julian calendar. The denomination 613 for this year has been used since the early medieval period, when the Anno Domini calendar era became the prevalent method in Europe for naming years.

Events 
<onlyinclude>

By place

Byzantine Empire 
 Emperor Heraclius marries his niece Martina; she becomes empress (Augusta) of the Byzantine Empire. This second marriage is considered to fall within the prohibited degree of kinship, and is approved by the Catholic Church in Constantinople.
 January 22 – Constantine is crowned co-emperor (Caesar) by his father Heraclius and shortly after betrothed to his cousin, Gregoria, daughter of Nicetas. Only 8 months old, Constantine has no real power and his dynastic title is purely ceremonial.
 Byzantine–Persian War: Heraclius appoints himself commander-in-chief, along with his brother Theodore (curopalates), to solidify command of the army.
 Battle of Antioch: Heraclius mobilises a Byzantine expeditionary force to Antioch (Syria), but is completely defeated outside the city by the Persians. Shahin Vahmanzadegan makes further inroads into Central and Western Anatolia. In Syria, Shahrbaraz captures the cities of Damascus, Apamea and Emesa.

Europe 
 King Theuderic II dies of dysentery in the Austrasian capital of Metz, while preparing a campaign against his longtime enemy, Chlothar II. His grandmother Brunhilda attempts to establish a third regency for her illegitimate great-grandson Sigebert II.
 Chlothar II reunites the Frankish Kingdom by ordering the murder of Sigebert II. He accuses Brunhilda, age 70, of killing ten kings of the Franks (according to the Liber Historiae Francorum). She is dragged to death behind a wild horse at Abbeville.

Britain 

 Battle of Chester: King Æthelfrith of Northumbria invades Gwynedd (northwest Wales), in order to route out his old enemy, Edwin of Deira. A united Brythonic force (Gwynedd, Powys, Pengwern and Dumnonian warriors) is defeated near Chester.

Asia 
 Goguryeo–Sui War: Emperor Yángdi crosses the Liao River again, and puts Manchuria under siege. During the campaign Yang Xuangan, an official of the Sui dynasty, starts a rebellion near Luoyang. Fearing attacks from two fronts, Yángdi is forced to retreat his army.   
 Isanapura becomes the capital of the Cambodian kingdom of Chenla (approximate date).

By topic

Religion 
 Islam: Muhammad begins preaching in public. He spreads the message of Islam and encourages a personal devotion to God. Quraysh leaders of Mecca oppose any change in the traditional tribal and religious customs.

Births 
 Woncheuk, Korean Buddhist monk (d. 696)

Deaths 
 April 22 – Saint Theodore of Sykeon, Byzantine ascetic
 Bledric ap Custennin, king of Dumnonia (England)
 Brunhilda, queen of Austrasia
 Priscus, Byzantine general
 Sigebert II, king of Austrasia
 Theuderic II, king of Austrasia
 Uncelen, Duke of Alemannia (Germany)
 Yang Xuangan, official of the Sui dynasty

References

Sources